Hermon W. Pratt (July 20, 1845 – May 2, 1918) was a Massachusetts politician who served as the 21st Mayor of Chelsea, Massachusetts.

Chelsea City Council and Board of Aldermen
Pratt was on the Chelsea city council from 1884 to 1886, and on the Chelsea Board of Aldermen in 1887–88 and 1895–96.

Election as Mayor of Chelsea
In 1896 Pratt ran for Mayor of Chelsea, Massachusetts.  In the Chelsea Republican caucuses held on November 24, 1896, Pratt received the Republican nomination Mayor of Chelsea, beating Seth J. Littlefield by 214 Votes.
In December 1896 Pratt was elected Mayor of Chelsea by a Plurality of 2,305 votes over John T Hadaway President of the Chelsea Board of Aldermen.  In November 1897 Pratt announced that he would not be a candidate for reelection.

Chelsea Board of Trade
After he was mayor Pratt served as the President of the Chelsea Board of Trade.

Death
Pratt died May 2, 1918 at Whidden Hospital, Everett, Massachusetts, as a result of illness with which he was stricken on April 16, 1918.

References

1845 births
1918 deaths
Mayors of Chelsea, Massachusetts
Massachusetts Republicans
Massachusetts city council members
19th-century American politicians